Beijingnan (Beijing South) railway station is a large railway station in Fengtai District, Beijing, about  south of central Beijing, between the 2nd and 3rd ring roads. The station in its present form opened on 1 August 2008 and mainly serves high speed trains.

The current station replaced the old Beijing South station, originally known as Majiapu railway station and later renamed Yongdingmen railway station, which stood 500 metres away. This station was in use from 1897 to 2006.

The new Beijing South railway station is the city's largest station, and is one of the largest in Asia. It joins the main Beijing railway station and the Beijing West railway station as one of three main passenger rail hubs in the Chinese capital. CRH night sleepers to and from Shanghai also depart from this station.

The station integrates two Beijing Subway line stations, bus hubs (including an airport shuttle bus), and taxi stands, into the same building, and includes a wide variety of restaurants in the station itself.

Design and construction

The terminus occupies a  site in Fengtai.

The enormous oval-shaped station was designed by the British architecture firm of TFP Farrells in collaboration with the Tianjin Design Institute. The glass ceiling is outfitted with 3,246 solar panels to generate electricity. Its 24 platforms have the capacity to dispatch 30,000 passengers per hour or almost 241 million a year. The  waiting area can accommodate 10,000 passengers.

On the elevated departures concourse, there are designated waiting areas and VIP lounges (with better seating and, in the lounges, free food and snacks) for passengers travelling in CRH Business Class, and a number of restaurants and corner shops. There are also a number of ticket counters (where nationwide ticketing services are available) and an increasing number of retail stores and fast food stalls. Ticket machines are available to holders of the PRC ID card and sell tickets for trains departing from this station. 23 sets of ticket gates despatch passengers onto trains.

The arrivals level is underground, with 8 arrival gates situated in the immediate vicinity of the Beijing Subway station concourse. To the sides are two taxi stands, and separated West and East parking lots for private cars (including a mezzanine level). Express entrances have been built, and are presently in use for all C trains to Tianjin, as well as some trains to Shanghai. Ticket machines and a few ticket counters are also available at the arrivals level. As with the departures level, a variety of restaurants and corner shops are also available at the arrivals level. Two floors below the arrivals level are the platforms for Lines 4 and 14, respectively.

Reconstruction began on 10 May 2006, immediately after services ended at the old station. The station was complete for the 1 August 2008 reopening. In 2011 and 2012, new restaurants, fast food stalls, and corner shops were added. To cut queues, traditional counters at the arrival level were replaced with ticket machines.

Local transportation
, public transportation is accessible within the station itself.  The Beijing Subway's Beijing South Station subway stop has Line 4 and Line 14 service. The Beijing Bus has three stops at the station. The Beijing Airport Bus provides service to the Beijing Capital International Airport. After 11:30pm, the only public transport option is night buses17. A taxi line is available inside the station.

Services

China Railway

Beijing South Station is the terminal for two China Railway High-speed (CRH) railway lines. The Beijing–Tianjin Intercity Railway has frequent service to Tianjin. The Beijing–Shanghai High-Speed Railway runs trains to Jinan, Nanjing, and Shanghai, with several trains continuing to Hangzhou and Ningbo. This railway also has services to Qingdao (via the Jiao'ao–Jinan branch), Hefei (via the Bengbu–Hefei branch) and Fuzhou (via the Hefei–Fuzhou High-Speed Railway). There is also a service to Northeast China. In July 2013, travel time to Hangzhou was cut by one hour for direct services that skip Shanghai.

Beijing Subway

Beijingnan Zhan (Beijing South railway station) is a subway station on Line 4 and Line 14 of the Beijing Subway in China. It is located under the building of Beijing South railway station. The station opened on 28 September 2009, when the whole Line 4 was put in operation. The station on average has 135,000 entrances and exits per day.

Beijing South railway station is an underground station with one platform and two side tracks. Line 4 runs at the station in the direction north–south, and Line 14 runs west–east.

Station Layout 
The line 4 and line 14 stations both have underground island platforms.

Notes

External links
 Beijing South Railway Station Guide
 [201/http://www.bjrailwaystation.com.cn/ Official site]
 Photos of the reconstruction 2007-2008
 Beijing Train Time Table & Rail Transportation Guide

Railway stations in Beijing
Railway stations in China opened in 2008
Stations on the Beijing–Shanghai Railway
Beijing Subway stations in Fengtai District
Railway stations in China opened in 2009